Fast & Furious (also known as The Fast and the Furious) is a media franchise centered on a series of action films that are largely concerned with family, heists, spies, and street racing. The franchise also includes short films, a television series, toys, video games, live shows, and theme park attractions. It is distributed by Universal Pictures.

The first film was released in 2001, which began the original tetralogy of films focused on illegal street racing and culminated in the film Fast & Furious (2009). The series transitioned towards heists and spying with Fast Five (2011) and was followed by five sequels, with the most recent, Fast X, set for release in May 2023. The main films are known as The Fast Saga.

Universal expanded the series to include the spin-off film Fast & Furious Presents: Hobbs & Shaw (2019), while its subsidiary DreamWorks Animation followed this with the animated streaming television series Fast & Furious Spy Racers. Soundtrack albums have been released for all the films, as well as compilation albums containing existing music heard in the films. Two short films that tie into the series have also been released.

The series has been commercially successful. It is Universal's biggest franchise and the eighth highest-grossing film series, with a combined gross of over $6 billion. Critical reception for the first four films were mixed to negative until the fifth and later films, which were more mixed to positively received. Outside of the films, Fast & Furious has been the focus of other media, including attractions at Universal Studios Hollywood and Universal Studios Florida, live shows, commercials, toys, and video games. It is considered the vehicle that propelled lead actors Vin Diesel and Paul Walker to stardom.

Films

The Fast Saga

The Fast and the Furious (2001) 

Brian O'Conner, an undercover cop, is tasked with discovering the identities of a group of unknown automobile hijackers, believed to be led by Dominic Toretto.

2 Fast 2 Furious (2003) 

Brian O'Conner and Roman Pearce team up to go undercover for the U.S. Customs Service to bring down drug lord Carter Verone in exchange for the erasure of their criminal records.

This is the only film in the main series without Vin Diesel as Dominic Toretto.

The Fast and the Furious: Tokyo Drift (2006) 

High school car enthusiast Sean Boswell is sent to live in Tokyo with his father and finds solace in the city's drifting community.

Vin Diesel makes a cameo appearance as Dominic Toretto at the end of the film.

Fast & Furious (2009) 

Dominic Toretto and Federal Bureau of Investigation (FBI) agent Brian O'Conner are forced to work together to avenge the murder of Toretto's lover Letty Ortiz and apprehend drug lord Arturo Braga.

The film is set five years after the events of The Fast and the Furious, and before Tokyo Drift, with Sung Kang reprising his role as Han Lue from the latter film.

Fast Five (2011) 

Dominic Toretto, Brian O'Conner, and Mia Toretto plan a heist to steal $100 million from corrupt businessman Hernan Reyes while being pursued for arrest by U.S. Diplomatic Security Service (DSS) agent Luke Hobbs.

The film is also set before the events of Tokyo Drift. Despite not appearing in the film, a picture of Michelle Rodriguez as Letty Ortiz is seen in the mid-credits scene, where Eva Mendes reprises her role as Monica Fuentes from 2 Fast 2 Furious.

Fast & Furious 6 (2013) 

Dominic Toretto, Brian O'Conner and their team are offered amnesty for their crimes by Luke Hobbs, in exchange for helping him take down a skilled mercenary organization led by Owen Shaw, one member of which is Toretto's former lover Letty Ortiz.

The film is the final film to be set before the events of Tokyo Drift. Jason Statham appears as Owen's older brother Deckard Shaw in the credits scene, seemingly killing Han, as seen in Tokyo Drift.

Furious 7 (2015) 

Deckard Shaw, a rogue special forces assassin seeking to avenge his comatose younger brother Owen Shaw, puts Dominic Toretto and the team in danger once again.

The film is set after the events of Fast & Furious 6 and continues from the ending of Tokyo Drift, with Lucas Black reprising his role as Sean Boswell. It also marks the final appearance of Paul Walker as Brian O'Conner, due to his death in 2013.

The Fate of the Furious (2017) 

Cyberterrorist Cipher coerces Dominic Toretto into working for her and turns him against his team, forcing them to take down Cipher and reunite with him.

This is the first film since Tokyo Drift to not feature Paul Walker as Brian O'Conner and Jordana Brewster as Mia Toretto. It also marks the final appearance of Dwayne Johnson as Luke Hobbs in the main series.

F9 (2021) 

Dominic Toretto and his family must stop a world-shattering plot headed by an aristocrat named Otto, including Cipher and Jakob Toretto, a rogue agent and Dominic's estranged brother.

The film is set two years after the events of The Fate of the Furious. Jason Statham appears as Deckard Shaw in the mid-credits scene, while Jordana Brewster returns to the franchise in her role of Mia Toretto, along with Sung Kang as Han Lue, who is revealed to be alive, and Lucas Black as Sean Boswell. Shad Moss and Jason Tobin reprise their roles as Twinkie and Earl Hu respectively from Tokyo Drift.

Fast X (2023) 

Dominic Toretto must protect his family and crew from Dante Reyes, the son of deceased drug kingpin Hernan Reyes.

Fast X is set after the events of F9 and twelve years after Fast Five.

Spin-off film

Fast & Furious Presents: Hobbs & Shaw (2019) 

Luke Hobbs and Deckard Shaw team up with Deckard's sister Hattie to battle cybernetically enhanced terrorist Brixton Lore threatening the world with a deadly virus.

The film is set after the events of The Fate of the Furious. Helen Mirren reprises her role as Deckard, Owen and Hattie's mother, Magdalene Shaw, from the main series.

Short films 

The short films were either released direct-to-video or saw limited theatrical distribution, being mostly included as special features for The Fast and the Furious, 2 Fast 2 Furious, and Fast & Furious, as part of the DVD releases. The films, which range from 10 to 20 minutes, are designed to be self-contained stories that provide backstory for characters or events introduced in the films. They were also designed to bridge the chronological gap that was created as the initial leads departed the series.

The Turbo Charged Prelude for 2 Fast 2 Furious (2003) 

The film follows Brian O'Conner and details his escape from Los Angeles and avoidance of law enforcement, which culminates in his eventual arrival to Miami.

The film is set between the events of The Fast and the Furious and 2 Fast 2 Furious.

Los Bandoleros (2009) 

Dominic Toretto lives as a wanted fugitive in the Dominican Republic. He eventually reunites with Letty and other associates to plan the hijacking of a gasoline shipment to help an impoverished neighborhood.

The film is set after the events of The Fast and the Furious and before Fast & Furious.

Television

Fast & Furious Spy Racers (2019–2021) 

Tony Toretto (voiced by Tyler Posey), Dominic Toretto's cousin, is recruited by a government agency together with his friends to infiltrate an elite racing league serving as a front for a crime organization called SH1FT3R that is bent on world domination.

Fast & Furious Spy Racers is an animated series produced by DreamWorks Animation Television, based on the film franchise. Vin Diesel reprises his role as Dominic Toretto, voicing the character in brief appearances. It is executive produced by Tim Hedrick, Bret Haaland, Diesel, Neal Moritz and Chris Morgan. Hedrick and Haaland also serve as the show's showrunners. The series' first season was released on Netflix on December 26, 2019, and its second season on October 9, 2020. Its third season was released on December 26, the fourth season on April 16, 2021. The fifth was released on August 13, and the sixth and final season premiered on December 17, 2021.

Cast and crew

Principal cast

Additional crew and production details

Production

Development

The Fast Saga 

In 2000, actor Paul Walker had worked with director Rob Cohen on The Skulls. Cohen secured a deal with producer Neal H. Moritz for an untitled action film for Universal Pictures, and approached Walker and asked him to suggest his "dream" action film; Walker suggested a mash-up of the films Days of Thunder (1990) and Donnie Brasco (1997). Soon thereafter, Cohen and Moritz brought him a Vibe magazine article published in May 1998, which detailed an undercover street racing circuit operating in New York City and suggested a story that was to be a re-imagined version of the film Point Break (1991), but set to follow Walker as an undercover cop tasked with infiltrating the world of underground street racing in Los Angeles. Upon hearing this, Walker signed on immediately; finding his co-star proved difficult. The studio warmed toward the idea of Timothy Olyphant in the role of Dominic Toretto, due to the success of the blockbuster Gone in 60 Seconds (2000), but he declined. Moritz persisted on Vin Diesel following his performance in Pitch Black (2000), with Diesel accepting after proposing several script changes. Moritz had difficulty choosing between the titles Racer X, Redline, Race Wars and Street Wars, but was ultimately inspired by a documentary on American International Pictures, which included the 1954 film The Fast and the Furious. Moritz was traded use of some stock footage to its director, Roger Corman, in exchange for a license to use the title. Upon release in June 2001, the film shattered box office expectations and a 2002 sequel was green-lit by September.

Diesel declined to return for the sequel, saying that the screenplay was inferior to its predecessor. Cohen also declined the sequel, opting to develop the film XXX (2002), which starred Diesel in the lead role. To account for these changes, Universal commissioned the writers to create a standalone sequel with Walker in the lead and brought in John Singleton as the new director. Filming was delayed by a year and the production location shifted to Miami. Tyrese Gibson, who worked with Singleton on the film Baby Boy (2001), was hired as Walker's new co-star and was the first entry in the series to feature long-running cast member Ludacris.

Universal attempted to bring back Diesel for the third installment, but he again declined due to other projects and a dislike for the script. After failing to secure the returns of Walker or any other member of the original cast, Universal ordered a reboot of the franchise. Screenwriter Chris Morgan subsequently attempted to revive the series primarily for car enthusiasts, introducing new characters, focusing on a car-related subculture and moving the series to Tokyo; Japan contains one of the world's largest automotive industries. It is the first film in the series to start its tradition of filming in locations outside the United States. Moritz returned and hired director Justin Lin, having been impressed with Lin's work for the film Better Luck Tomorrow (2002), which shared similar elements with Tokyo Drift. Moreover, the series were able to bring Diesel in for a cameo appearance, in exchange for letting the actor's production company acquire the rights to the Riddick character. The third film was the least financially successful of the franchise, received lukewarm reception and left the future of the franchise in limbo.

Away from the franchise, Diesel made a string of box office or critical flops, including The Chronicles of Riddick (2004), The Pacifier (2005) and Find Me Guilty (2006). After discussions with Universal, the pair shared an interest in reviving the series. After signing Diesel and confirming the return of Lin, Universal worked to track the first film's original co-stars and re-signed Walker, Michelle Rodriguez and Jordana Brewster in mid-2008. Walker was initially reluctant to rejoin the franchise after six years, but Diesel assured him that film would be considered the first "true" sequel. Morgan returned to write after the critical praise for the character Han Lue. Given the apparent death of the character in the third film, the timeline of the franchise was altered to account for his appearance. With the emphasis on car culture toned down, the fourth film, Fast & Furious, was a commercial success. Although critical reception was mixed, it reinvigorated the franchise, as well as the star power of Diesel and Walker.

In 2011, Fast Five was released. While developing the film, Universal completely departed from any street racing elements prevalent in previous films, to transform the franchise into a heist action series involving cars. By doing so, they hoped to attract wider audiences that might otherwise be put off by a heavy emphasis on cars and car culture. Fast Five is considered the transitional film in the series, featuring only one car race and giving more attention to action set pieces such as gun fights, brawls and the heist. Fast Five was initially conceived to conclude the franchise, but following positive reception at test screenings, alongside its eventual strong critical and commercial performance, Universal proceeded to develop a sixth film. Furthermore, the film is noted for the addition of Dwayne Johnson to the cast, whose performance was critically praised.

In late 2011, the Los Angeles Times reported that Universal was approaching the sixth and seventh installment with a single storyline running through both films, with Morgan envisaging themes of freedom and family, but later shifted to account for the studio's wishes to incorporate elements of espionage. Lin revealed that he had, after discussions with Diesel, storyboarded, previsualized and began editing a twelve-minute finale for Fast & Furious 6, before filming was completed on Fast Five. Upon release, the sixth film became the highest-grossing film in the series, grossing $788 million worldwide.

Universal lacked a major event film for 2014 and rushed Furious 7 into pre-production in mid-2013 due to its status as a bankable asset. Lin decided not to return to direct the seventh film, as he was still performing post-production on Fast & Furious 6. James Wan, primarily known for horror films, took over directorial duties. On November 30, 2013, Walker died in a single-vehicle crash, with filming only half-completed. Following Walker's death, filming was delayed for script rewrites, and his brothers, Caleb and Cody, were used as stand-ins to complete his remaining scenes. The script rewrites completed the story arcs of both Walker and Brewster's characters. Visual effects company Weta Digital was hired to re-create Walker's likeness. The film also introduced Nathalie Emmanuel to the cast. Ultimately, the film's delays saw it being released in April 2015, where it became the highest-grossing film in the franchise, grossing $1.5 billion. It was also the most critically successful, with praise being aimed at the film's action sequences and its emotional tribute to Walker.

The toll of multiple re-shoots dissuaded Wan from returning to the franchise and Universal hired F. Gary Gray to helm the eighth film, The Fate of the Furious. This film was to begin a new trilogy, which will conclude the franchise. Diesel announced that introducing Kurt Russell and Charlize Theron as characters in Furious 7 would help to reach this. The film was released in 2017 and received mixed reviews from critics, many of whom praised the performances and action sequences, but criticized the storyline and the long running time. It was an unabashed commercial success, grossing over $1.2 billion worldwide. Universal later announced that final two films will be released in May 2020 and April 2021, with Lin returning to direct. It was announced that Brewster would reprise her role as Mia Toretto, while screenwriter Daniel Casey was hired for the ninth film; F9 is the first film since Tokyo Drift not to be written by Morgan. Pre-production began in February 2019 in London, and filming began in June and concluded in November. John Cena was cast as the film's villain, portraying Jakob Toretto, Dom's brother. Moreover, Sung Kang returned as Han, while the film is the first to star Helen Mirren and saw Lucas Black reprise his role as Sean Boswell from Tokyo Drift. F9 was originally scheduled to be theatrically released on May 22, 2020, but was pushed back a year to April 2, 2021, due to the COVID-19 pandemic. It was then pushed back to May 28, 2021, and finally released in the United States on June 25. F9 also received mixed reviews, with praise for the stunts and Lin's direction, while it was criticized for its unrealistic action sequences and screenplay. It broke pandemic box office records, grossing $726 million worldwide.

Spin-off films 
In 2015, Diesel announced that potential spin-offs were in the early stages of development. In 2019, Diesel announced a film that will focus on the women characters from the Fast & Furious and mentioned that there are three spin-off films in development. Nicole Perlman, Lindsey Beer and Geneva Robertson-Dworet will serve as co-screenwriters on the project.

The first spin-off, Fast & Furious Presents: Hobbs & Shaw, was announced in 2018 and starred Johnson and Jason Statham. In late 2017, Variety reported Morgan had written the script, while David Leitch would direct. Originally, the ninth film in the main series was supposed to be released in April 2019, followed by the tenth in April 2021. Instead, Universal opted to proceed with the spin-off, to occupy the 2019 release date. This caused tensions between Johnson, Diesel and Gibson, with Gibson responding through an Instagram post, criticizing Johnson for causing the ninth film to be delayed. Johnson called out his male co-stars after completing The Fate of the Furious in a now deleted Instagram post saying, "My male co-stars however are a different story. Some conduct themselves as stand up men and true professionals, while others don't. The ones that don't are too chicken shit to do anything about it anyway. Candy asses. When you watch this movie next April and it seems like I'm not acting in some of these scenes and my blood is legit boiling—you're right." Johnson later cited scheduling issues as his refusal to participate in F9 and later confirmed he will not be in the final two Fast and Furious movies (F10 and F11) despite Vin Diesel asking him to return in an Instagram post, with Johnson responding in calling Diesel's attempt as "manipulative".

In October 2018, long-term producer Neal H. Moritz filed a lawsuit against Universal Pictures for breach of oral contract and committing promissory fraud after the distributor removed him as lead producer for Hobbs & Shaw. Furthermore, it was revealed in May 2019 that Universal dropped Moritz from all future Fast & Furious installments.

Better Luck Tomorrow 
The Fast and the Furious: Tokyo Drift (2006), directed by Justin Lin, marked the first appearance in The Fast Saga of Han Lue, portrayed by Sung Kang, who had already portrayed a character with the same name in Lin's 2002 film Better Luck Tomorrow; Han subsequently became one of the main recurring characters in the franchise. Although the relation between Better Luck Tomorrows Han and The Fast Sagas Han was originally left unaddressed, both Lin and Kang repeatedly confirmed during the following years that it was the same character, and that Better Luck Tomorrow doubled as Han's origin story, retroactively making the film part of The Fast Saga continuity.

Television series 
In April 2016, DreamWorks Animation was acquired by NBCUniversal for $3.8 billion, with the acquisition including a first look deal with the company to produce animated projects based on or with films under the Universal Pictures banner. In April 2018, streaming service Netflix green-lit the series Fast & Furious Spy Racers, with Bret Haaland, Diesel, Tim Hedrick and Morgan as executive producers and Hedrick and Haaland as showrunners. The series premiered on December 26, 2019, and has run for six seasons.

Reception

Box office performance

Critical and public response

Music

Soundtracks

Singles

Other media

Theme park attractions 
After the release of Tokyo Drift in 2006, Universal began introducing theme park attractions. From 2006 to 2013, The Fast and the Furious: Extreme Close-Up attraction was included as part of the Studio Tour at Universal Studios Hollywood. The tour's tram would enter a small arena, which featured a demonstration of prop vehicles being manipulated by articulated robotic arms.

A new attraction, Fast & Furious: Supercharged, opened as part of the Studio Tour at Universal Studios Hollywood in 2015. The tour's tram passes the Dodge Chargers used in the fifth film, as riders are shown a video of Luke Hobbs, who informs them a high-valued witness sought by Owen Shaw is on the tram. The tram enters a warehouse party, where the cast appear via a Pepper's ghost effect, before the party is shut down by the FBI and the tram moves into a motion simulator where a chase sequence ensues, led by Roman Pearce, Letty Ortiz and Dominic Toretto. A similar attraction opened at Universal Studios Florida in 2018. In the queue, guests pass through a garage with memorabilia from the films before getting a video call from Tej Parker and Mia Toretto inviting them to a party. Guests board "party buses", where they get the video message from Hobbs and the ride proceeds as it does in the Hollywood version.

Tour 
In 2018, Universal announced Fast & Furious Live, a series of live shows which combine stunt driving, pyrotechnics and projection mapping to recreate scenes from the films and perform other stunts. During production, thousands of stunt performers and drivers auditioned and were required to undergo a four-month training camp if selected. Additionally, parkour athletes and stunts requiring both drivers and parkour practitioners, also featured.

The tour was panned by critics. Ryan Gilbey of The Guardian wrote "large sections of seating were closed off; entire rows in the rest of it were empty" and "the only danger in Fast & Furious Live is the audience might die of carbon monoxide poisoning. Or boredom." Adam White of The Daily Telegraph gave the show a two out of five rating, commenting that "Fast & Furious Live often feels like an elaborate if lethargic playground game, one hinging almost entirely on imagination."

The tour was a financial failure; the show's production company entered administration in summer 2018 and all the cars and equipment was auctioned off in 2019.

Video games 
Fast & Furious has spawned several video games tied into the series or has served as inspiration for other video games, notably the Midnight Club series.

A video game based on the first movie was planned to be released in November 2003 for the PlayStation 2 and in 2004 for the Xbox, but was cancelled for unknown reasons. It was planned to be developed by Genki and published by Vivendi Universal Games under the Universal Interactive label.

The arcade racing game The Fast and the Furious, loosely based on the first installment, was released in 2004 by Raw Thrills. It was designed by Eugene Jarvis, the creator of the Cruis'n series of games, and shared much of the same gameplay. (It was ported to the Wii without the Fast & Furious license as Cruis'n in 2007.) Two arcade sequels followed, The Fast and the Furious: Drift in 2007, drawing on elements of the third film, and Fast & Furious: SuperCars in 2010.

A mobile game of the same name was also released in 2004, followed by a sequel, 2 Fast 2 Furious, released in the same year exclusively for mobile phones based on the second film. Several other games have been released for mobile phones, specifically the iOS and Android devices, with Fast & Furious, Fast Five and Fast & Furious: Adrenaline. Universal helped develop the tie-in Fast & Furious 6: The Game for the sixth installment and aided development for Fast & Furious: Legacy.

The game The Fast and the Furious was released in 2006 for the[PlayStation 2 and PlayStation Portable and drew heavy inspiration from Tokyo Drift. The game met with mixed reviews and sold moderately.

Fast & Furious: Showdown was released in 2013 for Microsoft Windows, Xbox 360, PlayStation 3, Wii U, and Nintendo 3DS. It marked the second game for consoles, and players controls multiple characters; its narrative was designed around the gap between the fifth and sixth film. It was released to negative reviews and middling financial success.

Various cars, locations and characters from the franchise appeared in the Facebook game Car Town.

In 2015, in a deal with Microsoft Studios, an expansion of Forza Horizon 2 was released for Xbox 360 and Xbox One, titled Forza Horizon 2 Presents: Fast & Furious. It was released to promote Furious 7 and received generally positive reception, although some critics lamented the limited involvement from the titular characters. In 2017, the vehicular soccer game Rocket League released a downloadable content (DLC) pack in promotion for The Fate of the Furious, where players would be able to purchase the Dodge Charger from the film as well as its exclusive wheels and six other new customizations.

Fast & Furious Crossroads was announced at The Game Awards 2019. It was developed by Slightly Mad Studios, who worked on Need for Speed: Shift and the Project CARS series, and published by Bandai Namco Entertainment. The game was originally scheduled for release in May 2020 but was delayed due to logistical problems caused by the COVID-19 pandemic. It was eventually released for Microsoft Windows, PlayStation 4, and Xbox One on August 7, 2020 to largely negative reception.

Toys 
In 2002, RadioShack sold ZipZaps micro radio-controlled car versions of cars from the first film, while diecast metal manufacturer Racing Champions released replicas of cars from the first two installments in different scales from 1/18 to 1/64, in 2004.

AMT Ertl rivaled the cars released by Racing Champions by producing 1/24-scale plastic model kits in 2004, while Johnny Lightning, under the JL Full Throttle Brand, released 1/64 and 1/24 models of the cars from Tokyo Drift. These models were designed by renowned diecast designer Eric Tscherne. In 2011, Universal licensed the company Greenlight to sell model cars from all films in anticipation for Fast Five. Since 2013, Hot Wheels has released 1/64 models of every car from and since the sixth installment.

In 2020, LEGO produced a set in their Technic line of Dom's Dodge Charger. In June 2022, The Lego Group unveiled Dominic Toretto's 1970 Dodge Charger R/T which was released as part of the Lego Speed Champions theme on August 1, 2022. The set consists of 345 pieces and 1 minifigure of Dominic Toretto.  On January 1, 2023, the LEGO Group released Brian O'Connor's Nissan Skyline GT-R, also as part of the Speed Champions theme.  It consists of 319 pieces and includes a Brian O'Connor minifigure.

Board games 

Funko Games released a board game based on the series called Fast & Furious: Highway Heist in 2021. It is a co-operative game for 2-4 players who choose characters and cars from the films to play through three scenarios - a tank fight, a semi-heist and a helicopter fight.

Fashion 
In November 2022, streetwear retailer Dumbgood collaborated with Fast & Furious on a legacy collection featuring t-shirts, shirts, and track pants containing moments and characters from the films. The collection was positively reviewed by Eric Brian of Hypebeast, who wrote, "Dumbgood's offering is more than just a selection of merch, but is positioned right at the center of car culture and the community around the films".

Social impact 
According to the LA Times, there are some Los Angeles Police Department (LAPD) officers who blame the Fast & Furious films for popularizing street racing in the city. In August 2022, residents of Los Angeles held a protest against the filming of Fast X, claiming the movies promote illegal street racing.

See also 
 List of highest-grossing film franchises
 Børning, a 2014 Norwegian street racing action comedy film and a spiritual sequel to the Fast & Furious films
 Initial D (1995 debut), a Japanese street racing media franchise with similarities to Fast & Furious (particularly Tokyo Drift)
 Thunderbolt (1995 film), a Jackie Chan racing action film with similarities to Fast & Furious
 Torque, a similar film but involving high speed performance motorcycles.

Notes

References

Works cited

External links 
 
 

 
Film series introduced in 2001
Action film franchises
Crime film series
American road movies
Techno-thriller films
Thriller film series
Universal Pictures franchises
2000s road movies
2010s road movies
Action film series
American auto racing films
American chase films
Films about automobiles
Mass media franchises introduced in 2001
Spy film series
American heist films
Film franchises introduced in 2001
2000s American films
2010s American films
American action thriller films